Potlatch is a ceremony among indigenous peoples in North America.

Potlatch may also refer to:

PotlatchDeltic Corporation (formerly Potlatch Corp.), a Fortune 1000 forest paper and paperboard producer
Potlatch, Idaho, a town in the United States
Potlatch River, Idaho
Potlatch, Washington, an unincorporated community in the United States
Potlatch State Park, a camping shoreline park surrounding Potlatch, Washington
Potlatch (convention), an annual science fiction convention in the Pacific Northwest
Potlatch (album), by Redbone
Potlatch (steamship)
Potlatch (software), an Adobe Flash-based map editor created for the OpenStreetMap project
Potlatch, a magazine published by the Letterist International from 1954 to 1957

See also 
 The Golden Potlatch (or Potlatch Days), a festival in Seattle, Washington State, USA held 1911–1914 and 1935–1941
 Potluck, a communal meal where guests bring dishes to share.
 Pot luck (disambiguation)